An English cricket team, organised and led by Lord Hawke, toured South Africa from December 1898 to April 1899. The team played two matches against the South Africa national cricket team which were retrospectively awarded Test status. There is uncertainty about the status of South African cricket as a whole in the late nineteenth century and so only two of Hawke's matches against provincial teams, those involving Transvaal and Cape Colony, are rated first-class. Hawke's XI is designated England for the Test series which they won 2–0. The South African teams were captained by Murray Bisset. Hawke's team was generally average in quality and nothing like a full-strength England team, but it did include three of the best players of the time in Schofield Haigh, Johnny Tyldesley and Albert Trott, although Trott's previous Test cricket had been for Australia.

Test series

First Test

Second Test

References

External links
 England in South Africa, 1898-99 at Cricinfo
 Lord Hawke's XI in South Africa 1898/99 at CricketArchive
 England to South Africa 1898-99 at Test Cricket Tours 
 "Cricket in South Africa" by P. F. Warner at Project Gutenberg

1898 in English cricket
1898 in South African cricket
1899 in English cricket
1899 in South African cricket
1888-89
International cricket competitions from 1888–89 to 1918
South African cricket seasons from 1888–89 to 1917–18